The 'pfennig' (. 'pfennigs' or ; symbol pf or ₰) or penny is a former German coin or note, which was the official currency from the 9th century until the introduction of the euro in 2002. While a valuable coin during the Middle Ages, it lost its value through the years and was the minor coin of the Mark currencies in the German Reich, West and East Germany, and the reunified Germany until the introduction of the euro. Pfennig was also the name of the subunit of the Danzig mark (1922–1923) and the Danzig gulden (1923–1939) in the Free City of Danzig (modern Gdańsk, Poland).

Overview

Name 
The word Pfennig (replacing the denarius or denarius as a low-denomination silver coin) can be traced back to the 8th century and also became known as the Penning, Panni(n)g , Pfenni(n)c, Pfending and by other names, e.g. in Prussia until 1873, Pfenning. The -ing- or -inc suffix was used, in addition to -ung, the formation of affiliation substantives and also appears in other coin denominations, for example in the schilling. Beyond that, its origin has not been clarified, but an early borrowing from the Latin pondus ("weight", cf. pound) is possible. According to an 1848 Leipzig trade lexicon the name pfennig was "originally the general name of every coin in Germany, which is supposed to be derived from the hollow coins or bracteatess, because these had the shape of a pan" (i.e. they were bent)."

The word Pfennig is etymologically related to the English penny, the Swedish penning, which was also model for the Finnish penni (1860–2001), the Estonian penn (1918–1927), the Polish fenig (1917–1918), the Lithuanian word for money pinigai and the pfenig (fening) of Bosnia and Herzegovina (1998–today).

Related currencies 
The pfennig was the progenitor of a whole series of later coin denominations, which became parts or multiples of the later pfennig. These include the groschen ("big [pfennig]", from the Latin grossus "big, thick" ), Angster ("narrow [pfennig]", from the Latin angustus "narrow, thin"), Albus ("white [pfennig]", from the Latin albus "white"; initially equivalent to a Groschen), Witte ("white [pfennig]"), Rappen ("pfennig with a raven"), Stäbler ("pfennig with the Basle staff"), Heller ("Haller [pfennig]"), Schwaren ("heavy [pfennig]") etc.

There were also "light pfennigs" (leichte Pfennige), "good pfennigs" (gute Pfennige) or "custom pfennigs" (Zollpfennige), which had this name on the coin. Some types of pfennig were given special names in the vernacular, such as the Erfurt "coffin pfennig" (Sargpfennig).

Sign
As a currency sign a variation of the minuscule letter 'd' for 'denarius' in German Kurrent script was modified so the terminal end of the minuscule Kurrent 'd', that trailed at the top of the ascender in an anticlockwise loop, was instead brought down behind the right of the ascender, to form a descender, that hooked clockwise, thus making it a distinct symbol, different from any of the other Kurrent letters in its own right: ₰; compare with the minuscule Kurrent 'd' given in the archetypal example of Kurrent script found in the upper right of the article on Kurrent.

The pfennig symbol has nearly fallen out of use since the 1950s, with the demise and eventual abolition of the Reichsmark with its Reichspfennig, as well as the abolition of Kurrent by the Nazis on 3 January 1941, thus making it increasingly cryptic as familiarity with Kurrent script has decreased since that time.

 History 
 Middle Ages 

Charlemagne established, in the so-called Carolingian coin standard, that from a Carolingian Pfund ("pound") of silver, 240 coins were to be minted (corresponding to about 1 .7 g of silver per coin). The coin was called in the Latin language of the time, a denarius after the old Roman coin (see Sachsenpfennig – Coin standard). From this coin evolved later the French denier and the Italian denaro. The Arabic word dinar (دينار) can also be traced back to the Latin word denarius. In the Old High German language, the denarius was already called the pfennig (“phenninc”) at the time of Charlemagne. In North German and Dutch-speaking countries it was later called a Penning and in England the penny. The term paenig for the Roman denarius first appeared in England around 765, when King Offa had denarii struck out of silver based on the Carolingian model. This explains the abbreviation "d" as in denarius, which was used for the "old" penny in Great Britain until 1971. The early pfennigs weighed around 1.3g to 2g, its weight tending to steadily decrease over the centuries. The widespread fluctuations in the weight of the same pfennigs were partly due to the manufacturing process, with the heavier pfennig specimens being sought out by private individuals in accordance with Gresham's Law. At that time and even partly up to modern times, it was the total weight of a certain number of similar pfennigs that had to be right for larger payments, a practice that tended to promote deviating exchange rates between smaller and larger coin denominations and which found its climax in the Kipper and Wipper era. For example, the terms a Schockpfennig (= 60 pf), Schockgroschen or "pound sterling" (= 240 d).

From the 8th to the 13th century, the pfennig (or denarius) consisted of high-quality silver, and was the only denomination in circulation, other units being used purely as arithmetic units and it thus had a high purchasing power. As a result, this era is also called the Pfennigzeit ("pfennig era") in numismatics. Only very rarely were half-pfennigs minted, which were also known as obole or scherfs.

Around 1200, the pfennig was the largest and only German silver denomination, apart from imported foreign gold and silver coins. Smaller denominations were created by cutting the coins in half or quarters, producing something called hacksilver, which was very easy to do with the one-sided thin hollow pfennigs or strubben, which were then referred to as bracteates from the 17th century. The "change" that was often still required for price and quantity equalization by buyers and sellers on the city markets were small amounts of natural produce and goods that were included in the overall purchase process.

Around 1200, the different mint lords of the Holy Roman Empire minted their regional pfennigs to very different standards in terms of gross and fine weights, because the German "kingdom" handed over minting rights or did not enforce as a uniform imperial standard consistently. As a result, many regional pfennigs with different exchange rates arose over time. Somes coins had a black tint due to the large addition of copper, and so a distinction was made between white pfennigs (Wißpennig, Albus, Silberpfennig) and black pfennigs (Kupferpfennig = "copper pfennigs"). A well-known example is the Haller Pfennig, which was later legally defined as a heller or haller in subsequent imperial coinage regulations as a separate denomination valued at two to a pfennig until the 19th century e.g. in Bavaria. Even the early hellers (Händleinheller''') had a noticeable addition of copper, so that the heller very quickly became the first German "pure" copper coin.

The pfennigs of the Schinderling period, the black pfennigs, were minted from 1457 mainly in southern Germany, especially in Austria and Bavaria, with almost no silver. The so-called Böse Halser ("Evil Halser") of this time essentially consisted of a copper-tin alloy. The period of the so-called Schinderlings ended with the phasing out of the 5-lot pfennigs in 1460. The black pfennigs undermined confidence in Austria's silver currency for a long time.Heinz Fengler, Gerd Gierow, Willy Unger: transpress-Lexikon Numismatik. Berlin 1976, p. 343.

For the successful introduction of the silver groschen currency, which replaced the regional pfennig, sufficient coins of lower denomination had to be available. The silver-rich Saxon dukes, for example, had hollow pfennigs and hollow hellers minted at Gotha and Langensalza to prescribed coinage ordinances. However, the constant reduction in the silver content of the groschen meant that new ordinances to reduce the silver content of the pfennigs that the cities sometimes minted themselves.

The Schüsselpfennig ("bowl pfennig") minted from 1374 to the 18th century is a concave pfennig, stamped on one side only, that was minted from 1374 onwards, and was so called due to its minting technique. It was created by stamping using one upper die only onto a larger planchet. As a result, the rim of the coin was pressed upwards into the shape of a bowl or plate.

The forerunners of the Schüsselpfennigs were the one-sided silver Engelpfennigs and Lilienpfennigs of the Free Imperial City Strasbourg and the Trier pfennigs, which were being minted as early as the beginning of the 14th century. They are so-called Ewiger Pfennige ("eternal pfennigs"), since unlike most bracteates, they didn't have to be exchanged regularly for a fee.

The so-called Palatine Weckelers, named after their depiction of a lozenged shield or heraldic lozenge (German: Wecke) were minted from about 1390. From the 15th century, a characteristic feature of the pfennig was its curved shape and a prominent circle of beads, which surrounded the coin image. The pearl circle does not occur in the later Schüsselpfennigs minted from the 16th to the 18th century.

 Pricing examples from the Saxon-Thuringian region 
Krug gives the following examples of what could be bought for pfennigs in regions of Saxony and Thuringia:

The  pfennigs concerned were usually the coins from the Freiberg state mint.

 Modern period 
 17th and 18th centuries 
By the late 17th century, the pfennigs had lost most of their value. The last pfennig coins containing traces of silver are rarities minted in 1805. Effectively, by the end of the 17th century the pfennig had been reduced to a pure copper coin. In the 18th century, some German mints minted copper and billonpfennigs at around the same time. From the middle of the 18th century, however, the proportion of billon coins compared to pure copper pfennig coins tended to decrease, which was also reflected in the 2 to 4 pfennig coins. The last silver-containing 1 pfennig coins with the designation "Pfenig" were minted in Germany in the Duchy of Saxe-Coburg-Saalfeld from 1808 to 1811 and date stamped 1808 and are rare. Even the copper pfennigs were not all of the same value. Bremen therefore called its pfennigs sware penninge ("heavy pfennigs") for which the common name Schwaren prevailed.

Some renowned coins made of copper are the Häller or Haller pfennig of Schwäbisch Hall, some centuries later called Heller, and minted throughout the country, and the Kreuzer (from "Kreuz", the cross minted on the coins), minted in Austria, Switzerland, and some regions of Upper Germany.

 19th and 20th centuries 
Until 1821, various smaller coin systems were in use in the Prussian provinces. Only in the provinces of Brandenburg and Westphalia was the pfennig the smallest coin in terms of value. With the Prussian small coin reform of 1821, a uniform small coin system was introduced for all Prussian provinces. To distinguish it from the pfennigs before the reform, the new denomination was called Pfenning. One thaler was no longer 288 pfennigs, but 360 Pfennings. This new ratio was also reflected on the side with the coat of arms: 360 EINEN THALER. Other states, such as Saxe-Weimar-Eisenach, minted 1½ pfennig coins well into the 19th century.

In the southern German states (Baden, Württemberg, Bavaria including the Palatinate, Saxony and other smaller ones), the value of the Pfenni(n)g was fixed at 1/240 of a Gulden by the coinage act of 1506 and that remained in force until 1871.
(1 gulden = 60 kreuzer, 1 kreuzer = 4 Pfennings, 1 Pfenning = 2 Hellers).
The half-pfennig (heller) was the only coin of the gulden period that remained officially valid after the introduction of the imperial currency (because of the beer tax in Bavaria).

In some southern German states, the term heller was a synonym for the pfennig (e.g. in the city of Frankfurt and in the Duchy of Nassau). In Bavaria, the heller was half a penny.

The Mark gold currency, introduced by the German Coinage Act of 1871 was the currency of the newly founded German Empire, was divided into = 100 pfennigs. This partition was retained through all German currencies until 2001.

The last West German one- and two-pfennig coins were steel with a copper coating. The five- and ten-pfennig coins were steel with a brass coating. The latter was called a Groschen, while the five-pfennig coin, half a groschen, was regionally (east of the river Elbe) also referred to as the Sechser, deriving from the former duodecimal division of the groschen. All four coins had their value imprinted on the obverse and an oak tree on the reverse.

The coins of the Mark der DDR were made of aluminium, except for the 20 pfennig coin, which was made of an aluminium copper alloy.

Pfennig since the euro
After the introduction of the euro, some, mainly older, Germans tend to use the term pfennig instead of cent for the copper-coloured coins (and the term Groschen for the 10-cents-coin).

Unicode
The pfennig ligature is defined and coded in Unicode as follows:

See also

 General 
 Bracteate
 Penny
 Denier, the French penny
 Coinage of Saxony

 Types of pfennig 

 Lilienpfennig Regional pfennig
 Roter Seufzer Sachsenpfennig Schüsselpfennig Weckelerpfennig''

Footnotes

References 

Currencies of Germany
Coins
Currency symbols